JScript.Encode is a method created by Microsoft used to encode both server and Client-side JavaScript or VB Script source code in order to protect the source code from copying. JavaScript code is used for creating dynamic web content on many websites, with the source code easily viewable, so this was meant to protect the code.

The encoding is a simple polyalphabetic substitution using three alphabets.

How to use
You can use a command line script encoder to encode your scripts. To encode a HTML web-page file called , use the following command:

screnc.exe default.htm defaultenc.htm

It would output to a file called .

Weaknesses
It has been reverse engineered and many websites provide an on-the-fly decoder.

References

External links
 Windows Script Decoder

Internet Explorer